Frank Joseph "Cactus" Keck (January 13, 1899 – February 6, 1981) was a pitcher in Major League Baseball. He played for the Cincinnati Reds.

References

External links

1899 births
1981 deaths
Major League Baseball pitchers
Cincinnati Reds players
Baseball players from St. Louis